Endesa Termic is a  chimney belonging to the thermal power station (i.e.:coal power plant) held by Spanish utility Endesa at As Pontes de García Rodríguez in the outskirts of Ferrol in the province of A Coruña, north-western Spain. Endesa Termic was built in 1974 and is the second tallest chimney in Europe.

See also

 List of towers
 List of chimneys
 List of tallest freestanding structures in the world
 List of tallest structures in Spain
 Endesa acronym in Spanish for Empresa Nacional de Electricidad S.A.
 Ferrol City and Naval Station in North Western Spain

References

External links
 Industrial Area & Mine for the Endesa Termic Plant in As Pontes de García Rodríguez
 The Coal Power Plant of As Pontes de García Rodríguez en Ferrolterra (Outskirts of Ferrol) North-western Spain.
 Black Shadows in Green Galicia - The Coal Power Plant of As Pontes de García Rodríguez (Web in Spanish)
 Foster Wheeler to Upgrade Second Unit at As Pontes Power Plant
 http://www.skyscraperpage.com/diagrams/?b1018 
 

Endesa
Chimneys in Spain
Coal-fired power stations in Spain
Buildings and structures in Galicia (Spain)
Science and technology in Galicia (Spain)